Soldiers' Daughters Never Cry is a 1948 novel by the British writer Audrey Erskine Lindop, her second to be published.

References

Bibliography
 Vinson, James. Twentieth-Century Romance and Gothic Writers. Macmillan, 1982.

1948 British novels
Novels by Audrey Erskine Lindop
Heinemann (publisher) books